Hermaea is a genus of sacoglossan sea slugs, a shell-less marine opisthobranch gastropod mollusks in the family Hermaeidae.

Hermaea is the type genus of the family Hermaeidae.

Species
Species within the genus Hermaea include 13 valid species:
 Hermaea bifida (Montagu, 1816)
 Hermaea boucheti Cervera, Garcia-Gomez & Ortea, 1991
 Hermaea coirala Marcus, 1955
 Hermaea cantabra Caballer & Ortea, 2015
 Hermaea coirala Marcus, 1955
 Hermaea conejera Ortea, Moro & Caballer, 2016
 Hermaea cruciata Gould, 1870
 Hermaea cubana Caballer & Ortea, 2013
 Hermaea dakariensis Pruvot-Fol, 1953
 Hermaea evelinemarcusae Jensen, 1993
 Hermaea ghanensis Caballer, Ortea & Moro, 2006
 Hermaea hillae Marcus & Marcus, 1967
 Hermaea minor Bergh, 1888  (taxon inquirendum)
 Hermaea nautica Caballer & Ortea, 2007
 Hermaea noto (Baba, 1959)
 Hermaea oliviae (MacFarland, 1966)
 Hermaea paucicirra Pruvot-Fol, 1953
 Hermaea vancouverensis O'Donoghue, 1924
 Hermaea variopicta (A. Costa, 1869)
 Hermaea wrangeliae (Ichikawa, 1993)
 Hermaea zosterae (Baba, 1959)

Species brought into synonymy
 Hermaea aoteana Powell, 1937: synonym of Placida dendritica (Alder & Hancock, 1843)
 Hermaea brevicornis Costa A., 1867: synonym of Placida dendritica (Alder & Hancock, 1843)
 Hermaea capensis Macnae, 1954: synonym of Placida dendritica (Alder & Hancock, 1843)
 Hermaea carminis Fez, 1962: synonym of Placida cremoniana (Trinchese, 1892)
 Hermaea cremoniana Trinchese, 1892: synonym of Placida cremoniana (Trinchese, 1892)
 Hermaea dendritica (Alder & Hancock, 1843): synonym of Placida dendritica (Alder & Hancock, 1843)
 Hermaea hancockii Trinchese, 1877: synonym of Hermaea bifida (Montagu, 1816)
 Hermaea kingstoni (T. E. Thompson, 1977): synonym of Placida kingstoni T. E. Thompson, 1977
 Hermaea lutescens A. Costa, 1866: synonym of Placida dendritica (Alder & Hancock, 1843)
 Hermaea orbicularis Costa A., 1866: synonym of Placida dendritica (Alder & Hancock, 1843)
 Hermaea ornata MacFarland, 1966: synonym of Placida dendritica (Alder & Hancock, 1843)
 Hermaea polychroma (Hesse, 1873): synonym of Hermaea variopicta (A. Costa, 1869)
 Hermaea saronica Thompson T., 1988: synonym of Placida saronica (T. E. Thompson, 1988)
 Hermaea venosa Lovén, 1845: synonym of Placida dendritica (Alder & Hancock, 1843)
 Hermaea viridis Deshayes, 1857: synonym of Polybranchia viridis (Deshayes, 1857)

References

External links
 
 Costa A. (1866-1869). Saggio sui molluschi eolididei del Golfo di Napoli. Annuario del Museo Zoologico della Reale Università di Napoli
 Gofas, S.; Le Renard, J.; Bouchet, P. (2001). Mollusca. in: Costello, M.J. et al. (eds), European Register of Marine Species: a check-list of the marine species in Europe and a bibliography of guides to their identification. Patrimoines Naturels. 50: 180-213.

Hermaeidae
Gastropod genera